The Guotai Liquor Asian Players Tour Championship 2012/2013 – Event 3 was a professional minor-ranking snooker tournament that took place between 5–9 November 2012 at the Henan Province Sports Stadium in Zhengzhou, China.

Stuart Bingham won his seventh professional title by defeating Li Hang 4–3 in the final.

Prize fund and ranking points
The breakdown of prize money and ranking points of the event is shown below:

1 Only professional players can earn ranking points.

Main draw

Top half

Section 1

Section 2

Section 3

Section 4

Bottom half

Section 5

Section 6

Section 7

Section 8

Finals

Century breaks

 140  Yu Delu
 139  Zhang Anda
 124, 122, 112  Tom Ford
 122  Lyu Haotian
 120  Chen Ruifu
 112  Ding Junhui
 111  Cao Yupeng

 108  Cao Xinlong
 105  Michael Holt
 104  Zhang Yang
 104  Andrew Higginson
 104  Stuart Bingham
 102  Ken Doherty
 100  Robert Milkins

References

Asian 3
2012 in Chinese sport
Snooker competitions in China